Kristopher Keating (born 26 November 1988), is an Australian former professional rugby league footballer.

Background
Keating was born in Sydney, New South Wales, Australia. He is the younger brother of Burleigh Bears player Matt Keating.

Keating attended Westfields Sports High School, and in 2005 played for the Australian Schoolboys team.

Career
After the sudden departure of Brett Finch in early April 2009, Keating was rushed into the starting side for the Parramatta Eels, playing the role of stand-off. Due to his small stature and quick acceleration, opposition defenders hade trouble tackling him, and he successfully broke the defensive line on numerous occasions during his first-grade NRL career. He broke his jaw in Round 10 in 2009 against the Manly-Warringah Sea Eagles and couldn't make a comeback in the same season.

After a poor display from Parramatta Eels’ early rounds, some changes were made and Kris Keating was named in the starting squad playing in the stand-off position. In succession to his form he was called up to the representative grades, playing stand-off for his City of Origin.

In June 2010, Keating signed with the Canterbury-Bankstown Bulldogs starting from 2011.  Keating played in the 2012 NRL grand final for Canterbury against Melbourne which Melbourne won 14-4.

After the departure of talismanic scrum-half captain Michael Dobson (rugby league) from Hull Kingston Rovers at the end of the 2013 Super League season. Kris Keating was signed by the Hull Kingston Rovers for the 2014, 2015 and 2016 seasons.

Keating only missed four games in the 2014 season, he missed two successive games because of injury, against Hull F.C. on Good Friday and a fixture against the Catalans Dragons on Easter Monday respectively. Keating was also dropped from the Hull Kingston Rovers squad because of poor form, for the trip to the capital to visit the London Broncos. He also missed Hull Kingston Rovers’ final game of the 2014 Super League season, against the Wakefield Trinity Wildcats.

Kris scored 5 tries in 24 appearances in 2014, his début and last season in the Super League.

On 8 November 2014, Keating signed a 1-year contract with the St. George Illawarra Dragons starting in 2015.

On 30 April 2015, Keating was granted a release from his St. George Illawarra Dragons contract to take up opportunities elsewhere at Sydney Survivors.

References

External links
Parramatta Eels profile

1988 births
Living people
Australian rugby league players
Canterbury-Bankstown Bulldogs players
Hull Kingston Rovers players
Illawarra Cutters players
Junior Kangaroos players
New South Wales City Origin rugby league team players
Parramatta Eels players
Rugby league five-eighths
Rugby league halfbacks
Rugby league players from Sydney
Wentworthville Magpies players